Peter Gilbert is a British footballer.

Peter Gilbert may also refer to:
 Pete Gilbert (born 1948), artist
 Pete Gilbert (baseball) (1867–1912), baseball player
 Peter Gilbert (Australian footballer) (born 1948), former Australian rules footballer
 Peter Gilbert (composer) (born 1975), American composer and teacher of music composition
 Peter Gilbert (filmmaker), American documentary filmmaker